SS Frederic C. Howe was a Liberty ship built in the United States during World War II. She was named after Frederic C. Howe, a member of the Ohio Senate, Commissioner of Immigration of the Port of New York, and president of the League of Small and Subject Nationalities.

Construction
Frederic C. Howe was laid down on 24 August 1943, under a Maritime Commission (MARCOM) contract, MC hull 1536, by J.A. Jones Construction, Panama City, Florida; she was launched on 30 October 1943.

History
She was allocated to United Fruit Co., on 6 December 1943. She was one of eight special ships, a Z-EC2-S-C2, a Tank carrier. She was built with larger cargo hold hatches and stronger crane lifts. J.A.Jones Construction built the eight Z-EC2-S-C2 Tank carrier in 1943.  On 30 October 1947, she was laid up in the National Defense Reserve Fleet, in the James River Group, Lee Hall, Virginia. On 9 June 1972, she was sold for $38,753.54 to Union Minerals and Alloys Corporation, for non-transportation use (NTU). She was removed from the fleet on 18 August 1972.

References

Bibliography

 
 
 
 
 

 

Liberty ships
Ships built in Panama City, Florida
1943 ships
James River Reserve Fleet